The following lists events that happened during 1992 in Sri Lanka.

Incumbents
President: Ranasinghe Premadasa
Prime Minister: Dingiri Banda Wijetunga 
Chief Justice: G. P. S. de Silva

Governors
 Central Province – P. C. Imbulana 
 North Central Province – E. L. Senanayake
 North Eastern Province – Nalin Seneviratne 
 North Western Province – Montague Jayawickrama 
 Sabaragamuwa Province – Noel Wimalasena
 Southern Province – Leslie Mervyn Jayaratne
 Uva Province – Abeyratne Pilapitiya 
 Western Province – Suppiah Sharvananda

Chief Ministers
 Central Province – W. M. P. B. Dissanayake 
 North Central Province – G. D. Mahindasoma 
 North Western Province – Gamini Jayawickrama Perera 
 Sabaragamuwa Province – Abeyratne Pilapitiya 
 Southern Province – M. S. Amarasiri 
 Uva Province – Percy Samaraweera
 Western Province – Susil Moonesinghe

Events
 Mylanthanai massacre takes place on 9 August 1992 when 35 minority Sri Lankan Tamils, including 14 children, at Mylanthanai in Batticaloa District in Sri Lanka, were killed.
 A series of attacks take place on civilians in the villages of Alanchipothana, Karapola, Madurangala and Muthugal in eastern Polonnaruwa District, Sri Lanka on 29 April 1992 leaving 157 dead.

Notes 

a.  Gunaratna, Rohan. (1998). Pg.353, Sri Lanka's Ethnic Crisis and National Security, Colombo: South Asian Network on Conflict Research.

References